Ástráður Gunnarsson (born 30 March 1948) is an Icelandic former footballer who played as a defender. He won eight caps for the Iceland national football team between 1973 and 1974.

References

1948 births
Living people
Astradur Gunnarsson
Association football defenders
Astradur Gunnarsson
Astradur Gunnarsson
Astradur Gunnarsson
Astradur Gunnarsson